Edward Ambrose Tovrea (March 20, 1861 – February 7, 1932) was an American entrepreneur who is best known as a prominent Arizona cattle baron. 

Edward  Tovrea was born at Sparta in Randolph County, Illinois.
He was the owner of  Tovrea Stockyards in Phoenix. Tovrea opened his stockyard operation in 1919. In 1931 he purchased the Tovrea Castle, one of the most famous landmarks in the City of Phoenix.

He and his first wife Lillian had five sons. In 1906, Edward divorced Lillian and married Della Gillespie. Tovrea died in 1932 and was buried in  Greenwood/Memory Lawn Mortuary & Cemetery.

References

External links

 Tovrea Carraro Society website
 Death of an Heiress   Phoenix New Times. February 27, 1997

1932 deaths
1861 births
Businesspeople from Phoenix, Arizona